Thadaiyara Thaakka is a 2012 Indian Tamil-language action thriller film written and directed by Magizh Thirumeni, starring Arun Vijay, Mamta Mohandas and Rakul Preet Singh. The title is derived from a devotional song titled Kanda Shasti Kavasam. The film follows a taxi driver who is suspected of attacking a don and goes on the run as the don's brother and the gang start chasing after him.

Director Magizh Thirumeni conceived of the film when he was bedridden with viral fever and took 7 years to develop the story and characters. He initially discussed the title with the director Gautham Vasudev Menon while working with him as an assistant on Vettaiyaadu Vilaiyaadu, but it eventually stayed with him. Once the story was completed, he wanted an actor apt for this kind of action film; a protagonist with the boy next door looks and demeanor. Arun Vijay was chosen for the role after being introduced to Thirumeni by a mutual friend. Similarly, he narrated the script to Mamta Mohandas, who agreed to act in the film. With Thadaiyara Thaakka, he introduced Telugu film actor Vamsi Krishna and debutante Maha Gandhi as antagonists. The cinematography was handled by M. Sukumar, while Praveen K. L. and N. B. Srikanth jointly edited the film. The music was composed by S. Thaman, while Madhan Karky wrote the lyrics. Thirumeni was impressed with Anal Arasu's stunts and called them the film's major highlight. The film was shot in and around Chennai, and Arun Vijay performed the stunts by himself.

The film was released theatrically on 1 June 2012, receiving critical  acclaim for its performances, screenplay, action sequences and technical aspects. However, it underperformed at the box office, which Thirumeni attributed to the low-key promotions and publicity. The film slowly gained praise from viewers after the end of its theatrical run. Arun Vijay would go on to call it the best film in his career, during an interview for his 2015 film Yennai Arindhaal.

Plot
Selva is a self-built man who owns a small travel agency in Chennai, and works hard to achieve something in life. He is all set to marry his lover Priya. The city is under the grip of dreaded loan shark brothers Maha and Kumar who would go to any extent to wield their clout in the city. During a rainy night, Selva comes across a drunk Maha, and within minutes, Maha is killed in mysterious circumstances. The blame falls on Selva. Kumar and his men want to bump off Selva. A perplexed Selva runs for cover. He sets out to find the real killer.

Past: Maha had abducted Gayathri Ramakrishnan, the only daughter of a wealthy Delhi-based businessman and has been using her solely as his personal slave for 9 months, revolting on the thought that even the richest and most powerful men in the country can't touch her. One rainy night, Gayathri escapes captivity and comes across the intoxicated Maha sitting on the road. She uses the chance to exact vengeance and kills him. Her helper at home discreetly (but unintentionally) places the murder weapon in Selva's car, so Selva is framed.

Present: Selva's two friends are taken captive and one of them is killed off brutally by Kumar and the other is set to be killed if Selva doesn't surrender to Kumar that night. Selva's travel agency are also destroyed by Kumar's men, and Priya's family escapes the city to save themselves. With his entire life turned around by a crime he did not commit, Selva takes a new avatar as he decides to wage a bloody war with the gangsters where he kills Kumar and the 8 members of his gang. To dispose of the bodies, he uses a meat grinder overnight and feeds the flesh to the pigs. Though Selva and Priya take care of Gayathri, she discovers that she is pregnant with Maha's child. At the same time, Selva and Priya learns of Gayathri's origins from the TV news. Unfortunately, Gayathri commits suicide.

Cast

 Arun Vijay as Selva
 Mamta Mohandas as Priya
 Maha Gandhi as Maha
 Vamsi Krishna as Kumar
 Rakul Preet Singh as Gayathri Ramakrishnan
 Aruldoss as Karikkadai Sekar
 Murugadoss as Velu
 Kaali Venkat as Alphonse
 M. G. Lohanathan as Senthil
 Aarthi as Priya's friend
 Vishwanath as Selva's friend
 Ramya as Ramya
 Debi Dutta in a special appearance in song "Naan Poonthamalli"
 Sunitha as cameo appearance

Production

Development
After achieving commercial successes with Malai Malai (2009) and Maanja Velu (2010), Feather Touch Entertainment and Arun Vijay came together for a third collaboration. The film was launched at the Palani Murugan temple, with the film's crew being present. The film's title was announced to be Thadaiyara Thaakka, derived from the Kanda Shasti Kavasam. Arun Vijay plays a left-handed character. About the title, the director said: "When I was working with Gautham Menon, we were discussing this title for Vettaiyaadu Vilayaadu. Generally, Gautham Menon will ask his assistant directors for titles for his scripts, and I had suggested this then. Gautham, too, liked this, but somehow we could not use it then. However, this title stayed with me for a long time, and when I had readied the script, I felt this suited the script very well" and about the story idea he further added that: "The idea was conceived once when I was bedridden with viral fever. When an idea is very good and simmers for a long time, it kind of grows on you, and the characters come to life and become powerful. That’s how the characters and the story took shape seven years ago".

Casting
Bollywood actress Prachi Desai was first roped in for the lead female role, signing her first Tamil project, with sources claiming that she was paid  15 million as remuneration. Despite having signed up, Desai failed to turn up for shooting, delaying the filming. Nearly five months later, she was removed from the project, and Malayali singer-actress Mamta Mohandas replaced her, making Thadaiyara Thaakka her third Tamil film. Prior to Mamta's entry, Kannada film actress Nidhi Subbaiah was considered for the role. Rakul Preet Singh, Femina Miss India 2011 contestant, who previously had starred in a Kannada film, was selected for another pivotal female role. Salim Baig, who played the antagonist in Gharshana, Kaakha Kaakha'''s Telugu version, was chosen to enact the villain in Thadaiyara Thaakka, with reports noting that there were two more villains in the film.

Filming
Some scenes of the film were shot at Border Thottam, at night. Arun Vijay stated that the film was primarily shot in night at second half. The team roped in Mumbai based model Debi Dutta for the kuthu number "Poondhamalli Dhaan". The track was canned in TR Gardens in an enormous set resembling the famous Zam Bazaar at nights on a grand scale with 50 dancers and 150 junior artists. It was choreographed by Noble Master. Arun Vijay had developed a six-pack for this film. Rain had delayed the schedule and pushed back the release. The crew shot the climax at the Binny Mills for nine days. A factory set was erected with 15 feet fenced compound worth 4.5  million rupees. Art director Mohana Mahendran tried to find a live location, but since he wasn't satisfied, the team erected a set of an old abandoned factory with machinery. In a scene featuring Arun Vijay, Vamsi and his gang was shot there. Stunt director Anal Arasu composed a lengthy shot that was canned with four cameras. During the take, Vamsi had to swing a huge iron bar against Arun Vijay in the end, where Arun has to miss it and jump. However, the iron bar slipped from Vamsi's hand and hit Arun's shoulder. Shoot was wrapped with few shots remaining.

Soundtrack
Soundtrack was composed by Thaman, with lyrics by Madhan Karky and Vaali. Arun Vijay had sung few lines for a folk-song with L. R. Eswari. The audio was launched at radio station "Suryan FM". Magizh Thirumeni, Arun Vijay, Thaman and Madhan Karky were present at the launch, while Mamta Mohandas was absent as she had one on a trip. Soundtrack rights were sold to Saregama.

Critical reception
Milliblog wrote: "Short, tuneful soundtrack by Thaman who gets the melodies right and the sole kuthu wrong". Behindwoods wrote: "A decent effort from Thaman that passes muster".

Reception
Critical receptionThe Times of India gave 2.5 out of 5 stars and wrote "‘Thadaiyara Thaakka’ at most times is grey and there is always a sense of anticipation as to what would happen next."Nowrunning wrote: "Flawed but praiseworthy flick". Behindwoods wrote: "Credible characters, fairly good screenplay and neat performances are the factors that work for TT, However, there are a few snag moments in the second half when the script’s journey appears a bit meandering.

Box office
The film has grossed  in first week. In the second week, film took average opening and grossed .

 Remake 
The film was remade by  Nanda Kishore in Kannada as Raana'' starring Shreyas Manju and Reeshma Nanaiah in the lead roles, and was released in 11 November 2022.

References

External links

2012 films
Indian action thriller films
Indian chase films
2010s Tamil-language films
Films scored by Thaman S
Films set in Chennai
Films shot in Chennai
Films set in Delhi
Indian nonlinear narrative films
Indian neo-noir films
Films shot in Palani
Films directed by Magizh Thirumeni
2012 action thriller films
2010s chase films